Helge A. Haugan (October 26, 1847 – May 17, 1909) was an American banking executive in Chicago, Illinois. Haugan was a founding partner of Haugan & Lindgren and the founding president of the State Bank of Chicago.

Background
Helge Alexander Haugan was born in Christiania, Norway, the younger son of Helge A. and Anna B. Haugan. In 1858, the Haugan family immigrated to Canada, settling in Montreal in 1859. In Montreal, Haugan learned the steam fitting and brass finishing trade.

Career
Haugan came to Chicago in 1862 and continued in the plumbing  business—initially as workman, and later as operator of his own plumbing shop on Milwaukee Avenue. In 1879, with John R. Lindgren, he founded the private banking firm  of Haugan & Lindgren. This bank specialized in serving the growing population of Scandinavian-Americans in the Chicago area. In 1891, the bank was incorporated as the State Bank of Chicago. His elder brother, H. G. Haugan, was a major investor in both banking firms.

Following the death of Helge Haugan in 1909, his son Henry Alexander Haugan became president of the bank. Both Haugan Elementary School and Haugan Middle School in Chicago Public Schools District 299 are named for Helge A. Haugan.

References

Other sources
Henschen, Henry S.  (1905) A History of The State Bank Of Chicago From 1879 To 1904 (Chicago: Kessinger Publishing, LLC.)

Related reading 
Strand, A. E.  (1905) A History of the Norwegians of Illinois (Chicago: John Anderson Publishing Co.) 
 Leonard, John W. (1905) The Book of Chicagoans: a biographical dictionary of leading living men of the City of Chicago ( Chicago:  A. N. Marquis & Co.)  
Currey, J. Seymour  (1912) Chicago, its History and its Builders, A Century of Marvelous Growth (Chicago: S.J. Clark Publishing Company)

External links
Chicago Public Schools
Helge A. Haugan Elementary School
Haugan Middle School
H.A. Haugan - President of the State Bank of Chicago

1847 births
1909 deaths
American bankers
Businesspeople from Chicago
Norwegian emigrants to Canada
Norwegian emigrants to the United States
19th-century American businesspeople